Sachs Harbour (David Nasogaluak Jr. Saaryuaq) Airport  is located at Sachs Harbour, Northwest Territories, Canada. Pilots will need to bring their own pump if they require 100LL fuel.

The current terminal building opened in 2011, replacing the previous terminal built in 1981.

Airlines and destinations

References

External links

Airports in the Arctic
Certified airports in the Inuvik Region